Boswarlos is a settlement in Newfoundland and Labrador, in Canada.

Populated places in Newfoundland and Labrador